Peter Campbell was a Scottish footballer, who played for Glasgow Perthshire, Burton Swifts, Greenock Morton and Scotland.

References

Sources

External links

London Hearts profile

Year of birth missing
Year of death missing
Scottish footballers
Scotland international footballers
Association football wing halves
Glasgow Perthshire F.C. players
Burton Swifts F.C. players
Greenock Morton F.C. players
Place of birth missing
Place of death missing